TV5Monde, formerly known as TV5, is a French public television network, broadcasting several channels of French-language programming. It is an approved participant member of the European Broadcasting Union.

The network is available across Europe on satellite via Astra 19.2°E and Eutelsat Hot Bird (13°E) (both free-to-air), online and via TVPlayer.

Summary
TV5 started on 2 January 1984 and was under the management of Serge Adda until his death in November 2004. The next director since 6 April 2005 was Jean-Jacques Aillagon, a former French Minister for Culture and Communication. The director-general is now Marie-Christine Saragosse.

In January 2006, TV5 underwent a major overhaul, including rebranding as "TV5Monde" to stress its focus as a global network ("Monde" is French for "World"). Also, the changes included a new schedule and a new program line-up. Since 1993, "TV5 Monde" is part of the channel's corporate name. Its Canadian operations are branded "TV5 Québec Canada", but the shorter version TV5 is also used.

History
TV5 was formed on 2 January 1984, under the guidance of Claude Cheysson, the French Minister for Foreign Affairs, and TV5 President Serge Adda, by five public television channels: TF1, Antenne 2 and FR3 from France, the Swiss Télévision Suisse Romande and the Belgian RTBF. The "5" from the name TV5 comes from the five public broadcasters. On 18 December 1985, TV5 was amongst the first four channels carried by cable television in France, inaugurated in Cergy-Pontoise.

Following its privatisation in 1987, TF1 retired from the TV5 consortium but continued to supply its programmes to the channel until 1995. On 1 September 1988, TV5 Québec Canada was created, followed by TV5 Afrique in 1991. The following year, TV5 transmitted using digital compression towards Latin America and the Caribbean. Its coverage was expanded in 1996 with the launch of its Asian-Pacific signal with TV5 Asie-Pacifique and the subscription channel TV5 États-Unis in the United States. Two years later, the Middle East feed was launched with TV5 Moyen-Orient in 1998.

In early 1999, TV5 split its European signal into two, with the launch of TV5 France Belgique Suisse, a signal specific to Francophone Europe (France, Belgium, Switzerland, Monaco, Luxembourg etc.). TV5 Europe continued to serve the wider continental audience.

A consortium formed by public channels Arte and La Cinquième entered into the capital of the channel, which brought with it new sources of programming. A new schedule was constructed, centred on news programmes such as news flashes on the hour, two TV5 bulletins and rebroadcasts of its partners' main news programmes (20 Heures from France 2, Soir 3 from France 3, Le Journal from TSR/RTS and 13 Heures from RTBF).

A meeting with ministers from TV5 in Vevey, Switzerland, gave a mandate to the channel's council of co-operation to reform the structure of the channel in the view of creating a unique worldwide channel. The national governments in charge of the five participants gave an agreement to turn management of TV5 États-Unis and TV5 Amérique Latine over to TV5 Monde, the new name for the channel's head operations in Paris.

From the September 11 attacks in 2001 to the 2003 Iraq War, the media coverage put the spotlight on TV5's particular way of broadcasting news bulletins from its member public broadcasters. International conflicts arising from the decision to go to war by the United States and the United Kingdom in which France notably refused to participate had relaunched the debate over whether to create an international news channel from a French perspective, resulting in the 2006 launch of France 24.

With the creation of France 24 placing TV5's own existence in doubt, its new CEO, Jean-Jacques Aillagon decided from 1 January 2006 to rename the channel to TV5Monde to underline its status better as the only international Francophone channel available on-air (France 24 was then available only in Europe, the Middle East, Africa and the United States cities of New York and Washington, DC, in French). Aillagon stepped down from his post on 3 March 2006.

The name TV5Monde applies only to its eight different signals, broadcast from its Paris headquarters. In Canada, such as in French-speaking Quebec, TV5 Quebec Canada is managed from Montreal, which keeps the original name TV5, as it is operated by an independent company that is distinct from TV5Monde. As well as being part of the TV5 family, TV5 Quebec Canada has its own management and its schedule is made with the Canadian viewer in mind and to conform to Canadian broadcast regulations, which, sets domestic production quotas and limits foreign investors to a minority stake.

In 2007, a new programme schedule saw the reduction of programming from France Télévisions (France 2, 3 and 5), for example, ti one daily news bulletin from France 2 by abandoning France 3's midday news programme. In 2008, TV5Monde became part of holding company France Monde.

In 2009, TV5Monde split its Asia-Pacific signal into two, one of them being TV5Monde Asie, a feed for territories located between GMT+8 (Hong Kong) and GMT+12 (New Zealand). TV5Monde's Pacific signal is an adaptation of its existing Asian signal that has been adopted to its time zones to serve its viewers better. It currently broadcasts in Oceania and, despite the signal's name, in Japan, South Korea and South East Asia.

On 25 February 2015, the new signal TV5Monde Brésil was launched broadcasting its programming with Portuguese subtitles.

Monaco was announced to be joining the service with its upcoming public service broadcaster, Monte-Carlo Riviera TV, from September 2022.

April 2015 cyberattack and resulting disruption
On the evening of 8 April 2015, TV5Monde was the victim of a cyberattack by a hacker group known as "CyberCaliphate", which claimed to have ties to the terrorist organization Islamic State of Iraq and the Levant (ISIL). The hackers breached the broadcaster's internal systems in what Director Yves Bigot described as an "unprecedented" attack, overriding TV5Monde's broadcast programming for over three hours, with service only partially restored in the early hours of the following morning. Normal broadcasting services were still disrupted late into 9 April. Various computerised internal administrative and support systems including e-mail were also still shut down or otherwise inaccessible because of the attack. The hackers also hijacked TV5Monde's Facebook and Twitter pages to post the personal information of relatives of French soldiers participating in actions against the organization, along with messages critical of President François Hollande arguing that the January 2015 terrorist attacks were "gifts" for his "unforgivable mistake" of partaking in conflicts that "[serve] no purpose".

As part of the official response to the attack, the French Minister of Culture and Communications, Fleur Pellerin, called for an emergency meeting of the heads of various major media outlets and groups. The meeting took place on 10 April at an undisclosed location. French Prime Minister Manuel Valls called the attack "an unacceptable insult to freedom of information and expression". A colleague in his cabinet, the Interior Minister Bernard Cazeneuve, attempted to allay public concern by stating that France "had already increased its anti-hacking measures to protect against cyber-attacks" since the aforementioned terrorist attacks on January earlier that year, which had left a total of 20 people dead.

French investigators later discounted the theory that the attack was connected to ISIL but instead suspected the APT28 or Pawn Storm, a hacking group with alleged links to the Russian government. Investigators concluded that the attack was a test of the same sorts of cyberweaponry that were used to switch off a power station in Ukraine.

As a result, Airbus Defence and Space implemented the Keelback Net cybersensor.

Content
Most of its content is taken from mainstream networks in the French-speaking world, notably France Télévisions from France, RTBF from Belgium, RTS from Switzerland and the Radio-Canada and TVA networks in Canada. In addition to international news, TV5Monde broadcasts Ligue 1, Coupe de France final, France Six Nations matches, films and music magazines.

Ownership
The number "5" in the name is the number of founding networks: Télévision Française 1 (TF1), Antenne 2 (France 2), FR 3 (France 3), TSR (RTS Un) and RTBF (La Une). The partnership making up the TV5Monde consortium are France Télévisions, Arte France, Institut national de l'audiovisuel, Canadian Broadcasting Corporation, Monte Carlo Riviera, Télé-Québec, RTBF and RTS. The consortium owns 51% of the service, and the other 49% is owned by France Médias Monde, a holding company that manages France's international broadcasting services.

France Télévisions: 46.42%
France Médias Monde: 11.97%
Radio télévision suisse (RTS): 10.53%
Radio-télévision belge de la Communauté française (RTBF): 10.53%
CBC/Radio-Canada (SRC): 6.32%
Monte Carlo Riviera (MCR): 5.26%
Télé-Québec: 4.21%
ARTE France: 3.12%
Institut national de l'audiovisuel (INA): 1.65%

Channels
Eight feeds are being transmitted:
TV5MONDE France Belgique Suisse Monaco (France, Belgium, Switzerland, Monaco, Andorra and Luxembourg)
TV5MONDE Europe (rest of Europe) with subtitles in 7 languages: French, English, German, Dutch, Romanian, Russian, and Spanish.
TV5MONDE Afrique (Africa except Morocco, Algeria, Tunisia, Libya and Egypt)
TV5MONDE Maghreb–Orient (Maghreb, Middle East) with occasional Arabic subtitles
TV5MONDE Asie–Pacifique (Asia Pacific and Oceania)
TV5MONDE États-Unis (United States) with occasional English subtitles*
TV5MONDE Amérique Latine & Caraïbes (Latin America and the Caribbean) with occasional Spanish and Portuguese subtitles
TV5 Québec Canada (Canada)**

(*)TV5MONDE États-Unis has certain programs subtitled in English, particularly some newscasts and most movies. It is unusual to watch a French movie without English language subtitles on TV5MONDE États-Unis.
(**)TV5 Québec Canada is produced in Montreal.

Logos

From 1984, for this television network, there are five different logos. The first logo of television network is used from 1984 to 1988, the second logo is used from 1988 to 1990, the third logo is used from 1990 to 1995, the fourth logo is used from 1995 to 2006, and the fifth and current logo is in use from 2006.

From 1991 to 2003, the digital on-screen graphic was located on the upper right corner of the screen. From 2003 onwards, it has been moved to the upper left corner of the screen and dropped from upper right corner.

Network availability

Europe
TV5MONDE FBSM and TV5MONDE Europe are free-to-air and can be received by satellite. Additionally:
Croatia: TV5MONDE Europe can be found on digital cable.
Denmark: TV5MONDE Europe can be found on digital cable.
Germany: TV5MONDE Europe can be found on analogue or digital cable.
Greece: TV5MONDE Europe can be found on ERT channel 22, 46.
Ireland: TV5MONDE Europe can be found on Virgin Media Ireland channel 825 
Israel: TV5MONDE Europe can be found on Yes channel 131.
Italy: TV5MONDE Europe can be found on SKY Italia channel 540 and on IPTV Infostrada TV, Tiscali TV and Alice Home TV on the same channel number and on TV di FASTWEB channel 68.
Netherlands:
TV5MONDE Europe
Ziggo: Channel 71 (SD) and in HD on TV Française Ziggo App
Caiway: Channel 41 (HD),
DELTA: Channel 500 (SD)
Canal Digitaal: Channel 194 (SD)
Kabel Noord: Channel 160 (SD)
T-Mobile: Channel 421 (HD)
TV5MONDE FBSM
Canal Digitaal: Channel 195 (HD)
Norway: TV5MONDE Europe can be found on Canal Digital channel 152.
Romania: TV5MONDE Europe can be found on Dolce channel 116. On UPC Romania in digital, it is available on channel 721, on mediabox or LCN.
Spain: TV5MONDE Europe can be found on ONO (Spain) cable channel 402 and on R channel 201.
Turkey: TV5MONDE Europe can be found on Digiturk channel 102 and Turkish Cable Television.
United Kingdom: TV5MONDE Europe could be found with English subtitles on Virgin Media cable channel 825; and free-to-air satellite via Astra 1L at 19.2°E and Eutelsat Hot Bird at 13°E. As of 19 January 2019, TV5 Monde has ceased broadcasting to the UK on the Sky and Freesat platform from Astra 2 at 23 E and on EE TV

North America
Neither TV5MONDE nor its supplementary services is free-to-air in North America.

Canada

TV5 Canada is a French Canadian version of TV5MONDE that offers largely the same programming schedule, but programming from Radio-Canada, which is already available across Canada, is replaced with content from the provincial educational networks Télé-Québec and TFO. As with TV5MONDE, TV5 Québec Canada is also a co-operative effort but involving French Canadian networks and producers through l'Association des producteurs de films et de télévision du Québec. The Canadian license also includes Unis, a channel focused on francophone communities outside Quebec.

United States
In the United States, TV5MONDE États-Unis is one of several foreign-language premium channels offered through International Media Distribution. Broadcast is in standard definition only. The channel is offered nationwide on Dish Network, AT&T U-verse and Verizon FiOS and offered in most major markets on traditional cable systems such as Charter Spectrum, Cox Communications, Xfinity and Bright House Networks. TV5MONDE is offered on cable and satellite as an à la carte selection for $9.99 a month. On most systems, a subscription to another programming tier or a digital cable package may be required. Purportedly because of underfunding, TV5MONDE cannot yet offer accurate advance scheduling or on-time programming, but progress is being made in those fronts.

In addition, TV5MONDE États-Unis offers a French-language children's channel, TiVi5MONDE, which offers a selection of children's and young adult programming in French. The channel is currently available on Dish Network, as part of the TV5MONDE subscription. Daily blocks of TiVi5MONDE programming is also seen on the main TV5MONDE channel.

TV5MONDE launched TV5MONDE Cinema on Demand, a video on demand service available to Xfinity subscribers in July 2013 that features a selection of francophone films.

Mexico, Central America and Caribbean
In Mexico and most countries of Central America and the Caribbean, TV5MONDE Amérique Latine & Caraïbes is available SKY México, a satellite television platform, on Channel 277.

South America

Brazil
In Brazil is transmitted with subtitles in Portuguese on their schedule. Negotiations are currently being held to launch the first original channel productions in the country. TV5MONDE Brésil is available on SKY Brasil on channel 108, Claro TV on channel 132, Net on channel 141 as well as Vivo TV.

Other countries
TV5MONDE Amérique Latine & Caraïbes is not free-to-air in South America. The channel is available on main pay-TV operators in most Hispanic countries, with programming subtitled in Spanish.

In French Guiana, a French overseas territory in northern South America, the channel is free and broadcast with programming entirely in French.

Asia, Australia and New Zealand
The channel is free to air from the AsiaSat 3S satellite, covering most of Asia and Australia. Triangle TV in Auckland, Nepal (Everest) and Wellington rebroadcasts some news programmes. In Nepal (Everest), TiVi5 Monde is broadcast by Dish Home on Channel no D-864. In Singapore, the StarHub TV service broadcasts it on Channel 152 for its digital service customers on MediaCorp TV Channel 5 and MediaCorp TV HD5. TV5Monde Asie is available in television providers in Bangladesh. In Australia, multilingual broadcaster SBS broadcasts network news bulletin 64' Le Monde en français every day as part of WorldWatch programming.

In India, Zee Network provides the channel for its Dish Network DTH services subscribers. Also, many others like Hathway cable TV and local cable TV operators offer TV5Monde free of cost. The channel is also available in Japan on the Fuji Television platform (as TV5MONDE Pacifique though Japan is a part of the Asia) and on Television New Zealand in New Zealand.

In South Korea, ISP provider Qrix offers TV5 on its premium HD cable package.

TV5Monde is also available in two former French colonies in Southeast Asia (Vietnam and Cambodia) with English and Vietnamese subtitles via PPCTV in Cambodia and VTVCab in Vietnam.

Middle East and North Africa
In most of the region, TV5MONDE Maghreb-Orient is available on Nilesat 101 and Badr 4 under the frequencies of 11900.00 V 27500 3/4 and 12073.00 H 27500 3/4, respectively. In Lebanon, it is also available on Cablevision, a cable television platform serving the country, and via Tele Liban's French channel, Tele Liban Le Neuf.

HD
High-definition (HD) broadcasting of TV5MONDE FBSM started on 1 July 2015 via satellite in the CanalSat mux as an upscaled HD feed. In March 2017, the HD feed was changed from upscaled into native HD (1440x1080).

TV5MONDE Maghreb-Orient has been broadcast in HD since 10 March 2014 via Badr-4.

TV5MONDE Asie has been broadcast in HD in Taiwan since September 2014 and Singapore via StarHub TV since October 2015.

See also
 TiVi5 Monde
 Denise Epoté, head of TV5MONDE Africa

References

External links

Official Site 
TV5 Québec Canada 
TV5Monde US
TV5Monde Asia
TV5Monde Charter 

Television networks in the United States
Foreign television channels broadcasting in the United Kingdom
Television channels in the Netherlands
Television channels in Belgium
Television channels in Flanders
France Télévisions
French-language television networks
French-language television stations
International broadcasters
Television channels and stations established in 1984
Mass media in Paris
Consortia
France Médias Monde
Islamic terrorism in France
2015 crimes in France
Cyberattacks
Francophonie